A gubernatorial election was held on 20 February 2022 to elect the next governor of , a prefecture of Japan in the north-west of the island of Kyushu.

Candidates 

Hōdō Nakamura, 71, incumbent since 2010, endorsed by half of prefectural assembly members of the LDP, the CDP and DPFP.
Kengo Oishi, 39-year-old doctor, endorsed by the Ishin and the LDP’s prefectural chapter.
Yoshihiko Miyazawa, 54, endorsed by JCP.

Results

References 

2022 elections in Japan
Nagasaki gubernational elections
February 2022 events in Japan